Erik "Samba-Erik" Johansson (born 18 May 1976) is a retired Swedish football midfielder who played for Örgryte, Malmö and Hammarby IF.

Kid: Elias Johansson

References

External links

1976 births
Living people
Swedish footballers
Sweden under-21 international footballers
Allsvenskan players
Hammarby Fotboll players
Malmö FF players
Örgryte IS players
Association football midfielders